

Theodred II was a medieval Bishop of Elmham.

The date of Theodred's consecration unknown, but the date of his death was sometime between 995 and 997.

References

External links
 

Bishops of Elmham